Justice S. R. Bannurmath (Kannada:ಎಸ್. ಆರ್. ಬನ್ನೂರ್ ಮಠ)(born 23 January 1948 in Dharwad) is the former Chief Justice of Kerala High Court and  he was Chairman of Maharashtra State Human Rights Commission from September 2013 to January 2018. Bannurmath was also the Judge of Karnataka High Court and served as State Public Prosecutor and Government Advocate of the Government of Karnataka. He is a graduate of Raja Lakhamgouda Law College, Belgaum. He is the first chief justice in India  to declare his assets in 2009 along with all judges.

References

1948 births
20th-century Indian judges
Living people
Judges of the Karnataka High Court
Chief Justices of the Kerala High Court
People from Dharwad